Ženski košarkarski klub Kranjska Gora – Jesenice is a Slovenian women's basketball club from Kranjska Gora.

Honours

Slovenian League
Winners: 2007, 2010, 2011
Runners-up: 2008, 2009

Slovenian Cup
Winners: 2011
Runners-up: 2007, 2008, 2010

External links
Profile at eurobasket.com

Basketball teams established in 1954
Women's basketball teams in Slovenia
1954 establishments in Slovenia